Nuatambu was an island in the Solomon Islands; it was located in Choiseul Province. Nuatambu was home to 25 families before it sank.

In 1962, the island had an area of 30,080 square meters. In 2014, the area was measured as 13,980 square meters. The difference has been attributed to the rise in sea level due to climate change.

References

External links
 Nuatambu Village

Islands of the Solomon Islands
Former islands